Israel has been regularly participating at the  Deaflympics since making their debut in 1957. Israel has only managed to claim their only medal in Deaflympics history in 1993 for basketball.

Israel yet to compete at the Winter Deaflympics.

Medal tallies

Summer Deaflympics

See also 
 Israel at the Olympics
 Israel at the Paralympics

References